Carrion is a fictional character, a supervillain appearing in American comic books published by Marvel Comics. The character is usually depicted as an enemy of Spider-Man.

Publication history
The Miles Warren clone version of Carrion first appeared in The Spectacular Spider-Man #25 and was created by Bill Mantlo, Jim Mooney, and Frank Springer. Carrion emerged as part of a storyline that was a sequel to the original Clone Saga and as a result he has one of the most complicated histories of any Spider-Man villain. His history has been retconned several times as successive writers changed the status of the various clones, the plans and motivations of Professor Miles Warren and other aspects from the stories. Often these changes took place in stories which did not directly involve Carrion, resulting in further stories trying to tie up gaps. No fewer than three separate incarnations have been encountered.

William Allen first appeared in Spider-Man: Dead Man's Hand #1 (April 1997), created by Roger Stern and Dan Lawlis.  McBride was created by Sal Buscema and Gerry Conway in The Spectacular Spider-Man #149 (April 1989).

Fictional character biography

Miles Warren clone
The original Carrion first appeared seeking to destroy Spider-Man, somehow knowing that his secret identity was Peter Parker. He unsuccessfully approached the Maggia with a plan to kill Spider-Man. He attacked Peter Parker, blaming him for the death of Gwen Stacy.

Carrion sought to destroy Parker/Spider-Man several times before capturing Spider-Man and revealing to him that he was a decayed clone of Professor Miles Warren, also known as the Jackal. Warren had created the clone and left it in a capsule to mature to full development; however Warren had then (seemingly) died and the clone was left developing in the capsule with artificially accelerated age. Something went wrong and the clone's body became like a living corpse. As Warren's clone, Carrion blamed Spider-Man for the deaths of both Warren and Gwen Stacy and sought to bring him to justice with the help of a malleable student named Randy Vale. Carrion captured Peter Parker and prepared to kill him with a giant "Spider-Amoeba" created by cloning cells from Parker. However Parker freed himself and became Spider-Man. In the subsequent fight a fire consumed the laboratory whilst the amoeba latched onto Carrion. The Spider-Amoeba suffocated Carrion, smothering him to death, and then unable to escape it perished in the fire.

Malcolm McBride
Many years later, Spider-Man learned from the High Evolutionary that Warren had not achieved cloning but had instead created a genetic virus that could transform existing human beings into what seemed to be genetic duplicates of other people. This left Spider-Man wondering "What about Carrion?" As Peter Parker he searched Miles Warren's old lab and found a journal which seemingly answered many questions, though many years later the Evolutionary would cast further doubt on this. Parker was followed by his university research student rival Malcolm McBride who discovered a test tube containing a strange substance. When examining it, McBride discovered it was an advanced genetic creation that when exposed to air grew rapidly and consumed him, turning him into a second incarnation of Carrion, complete with all the knowledge and powers that the original had displayed. The new Carrion attacked Spider-Man, picking up his predecessor's cause.

Initially this Carrion believed himself to be another clone of Warren but slowly found McBride's memories and personality trying to reassert itself. Carrion would fight against Spider-Man on several occasions. Carrion joined forces with the Hobgoblin against Spider-Man, and apparently sacrificed himself to save the mother of Malcolm McBride. Carrion turned up alive again, and teamed up with Carnage, Doppelganger, Demogoblin and Shriek on the killing spree Maximum Carnage across New York City. The mentally unstable Shriek started looking upon Carrion and the others as her and Carnage's "sons". The villains were defeated and confined to the Ravencroft mental institution. Later Shriek escaped and freed Carrion. She tried to dominate Carrion even further and encouraged him to destroy all aspects of McBride's life. However, when they confronted Spider-Man in the McBride household, McBride's mother was able to reach her son's true identity. Mrs. McBride and Shriek fought over who was the true mother. Malcolm/Carrion was driven to despair by this and tried to turn the Carrion virus upon himself. In a moment of compassion Shriek cured him of the virus. Malcolm McBride returned to Ravencroft.

Later the mysterious Judas Traveller invaded Ravencroft and briefly transformed McBride back into Carrion during an encounter with Spider-Man. However at the end McBride was transformed back by Traveller and all his memories of Peter Parker as Spider-Man were wiped. Subsequently, it was revealed that many of the powers displayed by Traveller were actually illusions, so it remains unclear what really happened.

William Allen
Following the death of the Jackal his corpse was examined by agents of S.H.I.E.L.D. Dr. William Allen ignored safety protocols and in the process was infected by a new, stronger version of the Carrion virus, transforming him into the third incarnation of the villain. The most deadly Carrion of all, he exhibited the further ability to use a "zombie plague" to control the minds of others, but also found that both Warren and Allen's minds fought for control of the body. As Carrion sought to infect the city with the Red Dust plague, Spider-Man confronted the High Evolutionary, who confirmed that he had deliberately sought to distort Warren's achievements by faking the journals and evidence to make it seem that Warren had never achieved true cloning. Spider-Man discovered Warren's old notes which were used to generate a cure, whilst he confronted Carrion. The latter now revealed that the original Carrion had indeed been a clone of Warren, created to incubate a virus to destroy mankind, but that it had been released too early and failed in its mission. Spider-Man subdued the new Carrion, who was taken into S.H.I.E.L.D. custody. The High Evolutionary provided data from Warren's journals that could potentially cure him. However, no cure was discovered for William, so he has been kept in stasis in a secure S.H.I.E.L.D. facility.

Carrion was at some point incarcerated in Negative Zone Prison Alpha. When Blastaar and his forces invade the facility in search of its portal to Earth, Star-Lord forces Carrion to help him send a telepathic distress signal to Mantis and the other Guardians of the Galaxy.

Carrion later appears as a member of the Shadow Council's incarnation of the Masters of Evil.

Sentient virus
A new version of Carrion, engineered by the Jackal, ran rampant through New York, jumping from one host body to the next (taking control of them in the interim). After being pursued across the city by Superior Spider-Man (Doctor Octopus' mind in Peter Parker's body), the Carrion virus took hold of Hyperion's body. After a brief battle with the Avengers, the Carrion virus was thought to have been destroyed by Superior Spider-Man. However, it was able to regenerate itself and returned to its creator.

The Carrion virus joined the Jackal and a clone of Miles Warren in their battle against Superior Spider-Man and Scarlet Spider. During the fight, it attempted to take control of Scarlet Spider's mind, but was stymied by the "Other" within him.

During the Dead No More: The Clone Conspiracy storyline, Kaine and Spider-Woman of Earth-65 rescue Spider-Man from Jackal. Afterwards, Kaine reveals to Spider-Man that he and Spider-Woman of Earth-65 came to this world to assist Spider-Man because they saw that apparently Spider-Man allying with the Jackal's offer on other worlds results in a global disaster in the form of the Carrion Virus. Doctor Octopus pulls a switch which activates the Carrion Virus in all of the clones and causes them to start rapidly decaying. Spider-Woman of Earth-65 escapes with Kaine as the Carrion Virus starts spreading which causes Anna to also be affected. Spider-Man tries to appeal to Ben, but Jackal ignores him and takes over J. Jonah's broadcast to tell the world that they will all die and be reborn. Spider-Man hacks into the Webware Emergency System from Parker Industries and switches it to evoke from every Parker Industries device on the planet, which sends out a large signal that stops some of the other victims from decaying.

Powers and abilities
The creature called Carrion is created when a genetic replicator virus derived from the mutated DNA of Professor Miles Warren comes into contact with a human being. The original Carrion had superhuman strength and durability, and could reduce the density of his body to become virtually intangible. He could disintegrate organic matter to ash just by touching it. He also had the powers of telepathy, self-levitation, and telekinesis of organic matter. Carrion also developed a chemical substance called Red Dust which can either render a victim unconscious, or act as a corrosive acid that can burn through flesh, metal, and other substances. Carrion has access to the scientific equipment used by Miles Warren in his "cloning" experiments.

Malcolm McBride, as Carrion, apparently had access to the same set of powers as the original, but had not yet taken the time to explore and hone his powers to the extent of his predecessor. He had not yet demonstrated the ability to become intangible or use telekinesis, and merely has a sense of intuition bordering on telepathy.

The sentient Carrion virus is able to infect and control victims without altering their bodies, allowing it to hide within them. If allowed to remain in one body long enough, it will be permanently bonded to it. The virus is resilient enough to reform itself after near-destruction. It can assume a bodily form of its own, one which resembles the previous Carrions. In this form, it can create a vapor that, when breathed in, allows him to control minds.

Other versions

Dead No More: The Clone Conspiracy
During the Dead No More: The Clone Conspiracy, the Jackal begins "reanimating" the deceased loved ones and enemies of Spider-Man, though a flaw in the resurrection process causes those brought back by it to degenerate into zombie-like Carrions unless they take a special pill daily. In numerous unidentified realities where Parker Industries allied with the Jackal's company New U Technologies, the degeneration becomes contagious and spreads uncontrollably, turning all of humanity into mindless hordes of Carrions.

Spider-Man: Heroes & Villains
Malcom McBride appears in Spider-Man: Heroes & Villains.

In other media

Video games
 The Malcolm McBride version of Carrion appears as a recurring enemy character in the 1994 video game Spider-Man and Venom: Maximum Carnage. He is one of the villains recruited by Carnage to help create chaos in New York. Carrion appears with Doppelganger and Shriek numerous times in the game and hovers above the player's character attempting to grab the character's head and destroy the character. The player has to defeat him numerous times on several levels with other villains.

Novels
 Per the Spider-Man novel Spider-Man: Requiem, Stanley Carter was infected by the Carrion Virus by the Cabal of Scrier, bringing Stanley back to life in an attempt to steal the Darkhold from S.H.I.E.L.D. Spider-Man and the new Stanley Carter/Carrion battled for a while but eventually Carter began to fight with Carrion for control of his own body and when the Cabal of Scrier brought back the ancient god Chthon (which would destroy the world) Carter/Carrion gave up his own life to stop the god. While Stanley was still alive he had hidden from the authorities in his uncle Emory Carter's house and Emory had been infected by the Carrion virus when he was around Stanley. When Stanley died Emory became the next Carrion but was later defeated by Spider-Man.

References

External links
 Miles Warren Clone at Marvel Universe Wiki
 Carrion on the Marvel Universe Character Bio Wiki
 SpiderFan.org: Carrion I
 SpiderFan.org: Carrion II
 
 

Characters created by Bill Mantlo
Characters created by Gerry Conway
Characters created by Roger Stern
Characters created by Sal Buscema
Clone characters in comics
Comics characters introduced in 1978
Comics characters introduced in 1989
Comics characters introduced in 1997
Fictional characters from New York City
Fictional secret agents and spies in comics
Fictional viruses
Male characters in comics
Marvel Comics characters who have mental powers
Marvel Comics characters with accelerated healing
Marvel Comics characters with superhuman strength
Marvel Comics male supervillains
Marvel Comics supervillains
Marvel Comics telekinetics
Marvel Comics telepaths
S.H.I.E.L.D. agents
Spider-Man characters